Los Lopeggs is a Mexican streaming adult animated comedy series created by Huevocartoon alumni Rodolfo Riva Palacio Alatriste and Gabriel Riva Palacio Alatriste for Pantaya. It features a cast of anthropomorphic eggs in a Hispanic family-like setting. The series features the voices of Angélica Vale and Carlos Ponce.

The series premiered on 17 June 2021 on Pantaya in the United States. It is the platform's first animated original series.

Synopsis
After being fired from his job, Yema (Carlos Ponce) and his family start a new business selling tacos with their new food truck in Huevalifornia.

Voices
Carlos Ponce as Yema
Angélica Vale as Carla

Release
The first six episodes premiered on Pantaya on 17 June 2021, with the first episode being made available for free viewing.

References

External links
Los Lopeggs on Pantaya
Los Lopeggs Episode 1 on YouTube

Mexican comedy television series
2020s Mexican television series
Spanish-language television shows
2021 Mexican television series debuts
Animated adult television sitcoms
Mexican flash animated television series
2020s animated television series